Siegfried Willem "Wim" Esajas (16 April 1935 – 30 April 2005) was a middle-distance runner from Suriname, who qualified for the Athletics at the Men's 800 m event at the 1960 Summer Olympics in Rome, Italy and was supposed to be the first Surinamese Olympian. Esajas missed the event, and it was alleged that he overslept it, whereas he was simply given a wrong starting time by Fred Glans, the head of Suriname's Olympic delegation.

Esajas was a multiple national record holder in the 800 m, 1500 m and 3000 m events in the 1950s, and was selected as the Surinamese Sportman of the Year in 1956. He retired from sport after the 1960 Olympics, graduated in horticulture from a college in Deventer, the Netherlands, and returned to Suriname to grow flowers.

In 2005, Suriname's Olympic Committee presented Esajas with a plaque honoring him as Suriname's first Olympian and with a letter of apology for the mistake made by its official in 1960. Esajas died two weeks later of an uncertain illness. He was survived by his son Werner.

References

1935 births
2005 deaths
Sportspeople from Paramaribo
Olympic athletes of Suriname
Athletes (track and field) at the 1960 Summer Olympics
Surinamese male middle-distance runners